The 2002–03 NBA season was the Pistons' 62nd season as a franchise, the 55th in the National Basketball Association, and the 46th in the Detroit area. During the off-season, the Pistons acquired Richard Hamilton from the Washington Wizards, and signed free agent Chauncey Billups. With the acquisitions of Hamilton and Billups, the Pistons got off to a solid start winning 12 of their first 16 games, and held a 32–15 record at the All-Star break. However, the team suffered a 7-game losing streak between February and March, but managed to finish first place in the Eastern Conference with a 50–32 record, which tied the 1977 Philadelphia 76ers for the worst record by a number one-seeded team in the history of the league. The Pistons were the only team in the Eastern Conference with 50 or more wins this season.

Ben Wallace averaged 6.9 points, 15.4 rebounds and 3.2 blocks per game, and was voted to play in the 2003 NBA All-Star Game for the first time in his career. He also won the Defensive Player of the Year award for the second year in a row, and was named to the All-NBA Second Team, and NBA All-Defensive First Team, and also finished in eighth place in Most Valuable Player voting. In addition, Hamilton led the team in scoring averaging 19.7 points per game, while Billups provided them with 16.2 points and 3.9 assists per game, Clifford Robinson contributed 12.2 points per game, and sixth man Corliss Williamson provided with 12.0 points and 4.4 rebounds per game off the bench.

In the Eastern Conference First Round of the playoffs, the Pistons faced elimination trailing 3–1 to the 8th-seeded Orlando Magic, but managed to win the next three games, thus the series. In the Eastern Conference Semi-finals, the Pistons defeated Allen Iverson and the Philadelphia 76ers in six games, and were a serious title contender, reaching the Eastern Conference Finals for the first time since 1991. Instead, they had their season ended with a sweep to the 2nd-seeded New Jersey Nets in four straight Eastern Conference Final games. The Nets would reach the Finals for the second consecutive year, but would lose in six games to the San Antonio Spurs.

Following the season, Pistons head coach Rick Carlisle was fired after just two seasons with the team and was replaced by Larry Brown, who had resigned from the 76ers' head coaching position on Memorial Day. Carlisle would go on to coach the Indiana Pacers as he replaced Isiah Thomas, who was fired after failing to reach the second round for three consecutive seasons in the playoffs. Also following the season, Robinson was traded to the Golden State Warriors, while three-point specialist Jon Barry signed as a free agent with the Denver Nuggets, and Michael Curry was dealt to the Toronto Raptors.

Draft picks

Roster

Regular season

Season standings

z – clinched division title
y – clinched division title
x – clinched playoff spot

Record vs. opponents

Game log

Playoffs

|- align="center" bgcolor="#ffcccc"
| 1
| April 20
| Orlando
| L 94–99
| Richard Hamilton (28)
| Ben Wallace (13)
| Chauncey Billups (8)
| The Palace of Auburn Hills21,261
| 0–1
|- align="center" bgcolor="#ccffcc"
| 2
| April 23
| Orlando
| W 89–77
| Richard Hamilton (30)
| Ben Wallace (16)
| Richard Hamilton (5)
| The Palace of Auburn Hills22,076
| 1–1
|- align="center" bgcolor="#ffcccc"
| 3
| April 25
| @ Orlando
| L 80–89
| Richard Hamilton (22)
| Ben Wallace (22)
| Chauncey Billups (5)
| TD Waterhouse Centre17,283
| 1–2
|- align="center" bgcolor="#ffcccc"
| 4
| April 27
| @ Orlando
| L 92–100
| Chauncey Billups (25)
| Ben Wallace (24)
| Barry, Billups (3)
| TD Waterhouse Centre17,283
| 1–3
|- align="center" bgcolor="#ccffcc"
| 5
| April 30
| Orlando
| W 98–67
| Richard Hamilton (24)
| Ben Wallace (21)
| Billups, Robinson (4)
| The Palace of Auburn Hills22,076
| 2–3
|- align="center" bgcolor="#ccffcc"
| 6
| May 2
| @ Orlando
| W 103–88
| Chauncey Billups (40)
| Ben Wallace (17)
| Chauncey Billups (4)
| TD Waterhouse Centre16,909
| 3–3
|- align="center" bgcolor="#ccffcc"
| 7
| May 4
| Orlando
| W 108–93
| Chauncey Billups (37)
| Ben Wallace (12)
| Michael Curry (6)
| The Palace of Auburn Hills22,076
| 4–3
|-

|- align="center" bgcolor="#ccffcc"
| 1
| May 6
| Philadelphia
| W 98–87
| Richard Hamilton (25)
| Ben Wallace (12)
| Billups, Robinson (4)
| The Palace of Auburn Hills22,076
| 1–0
|- align="center" bgcolor="#ccffcc"
| 2
| May 8
| Philadelphia
| W 104–97 (OT)
| Atkins, Hamilton (23)
| Ben Wallace (15)
| Richard Hamilton (6)
| The Palace of Auburn Hills22,076
| 2–0
|- align="center" bgcolor="#ffcccc"
| 3
| May 10
| @ Philadelphia
| L 83–93
| Richard Hamilton (24)
| Mehmet Okur (10)
| Billups, Robinson (4)
| First Union Center20,743
| 2–1
|- align="center" bgcolor="#ffcccc"
| 4
| May 11
| @ Philadelphia
| L 82–95
| Richard Hamilton (30)
| Ben Wallace (15)
| three players tied (3)
| First Union Center20,549
| 2–2
|- align="center" bgcolor="#ccffcc"
| 5
| May 14
| Philadelphia
| W 78–77
| Richard Hamilton (20)
| Ben Wallace (17)
| Atkins, Hamilton (5)
| The Palace of Auburn Hills22,076
| 3–2
|- align="center" bgcolor="#ccffcc"
| 6
| May 16
| @ Philadelphia
| W 93–89 (OT)
| Chauncey Billups (28)
| Ben Wallace (18)
| Chauncey Billups (5)
| First Union Center20,888
| 4–2
|-

|- align="center" bgcolor="#ffcccc"
| 1
| May 18
| New Jersey
| L 74–76
| Richard Hamilton (24)
| Ben Wallace (22)
| Chauncey Billups (6)
| The Palace of Auburn Hills22,076
| 0–1
|- align="center" bgcolor="#ffcccc"
| 2
| May 20
| New Jersey
| L 86–88
| Richard Hamilton (24)
| Ben Wallace (19)
| Chauncey Billups (10)
| The Palace of Auburn Hills22,076
| 0–2
|- align="center" bgcolor="#ffcccc"
| 3
| May 22
| @ New Jersey
| L 85–97
| Richard Hamilton (21)
| Ben Wallace (15)
| five players tied (3)
| Continental Airlines Arena19,923
| 0–3
|- align="center" bgcolor="#ffcccc"
| 4
| May 24
| @ New Jersey
| L 82–102
| Clifford Robinson (21)
| Ben Wallace (13)
| Chauncey Billups (6)
| Continental Airlines Arena19,923
| 0–4
|-

Player statistics

Season

Playoffs

Awards and records
Ben Wallace, NBA Defensive Player of the Year Award
Joe Dumars, NBA Executive of the Year Award
Ben Wallace, All-NBA Second Team
Ben Wallace, NBA All-Defensive First Team

Transactions

Trades

Free agents

Player Transactions Citation:

References

See also
2002–03 NBA season

Detroit Pistons seasons
Detroit
Detroit
Detroit